Craig Eugene McEwen (born December 16, 1965) is a former American football tight end in the National Football League (NFL) for the Washington Redskins and the San Diego Chargers.  He played college football at the University of Utah. He attended Northport High School, Long Island, New York.

College career
McEwen attended University of Utah and Santa Ana College. Offensive coordinator, Jack Reilly offered McEwen a full scholarship to Utah. In June 2015, he was ranked one of the best Tight ends in the university's history with 64 catches for 721 yards and seven touchdowns.

Professional career

Washington Redskins
1987's NFL strike created some opportunities for McEwen, who was one of the replacement players who filled in for the regulars while regular NFL players were on strike. McEwen played under head coach Joe Gibbs. He was then hired as a regular player and earned a Super Bowl ring from the Redskins’ 42-10 rout of the Denver Broncos in Super Bowl XXII.

McEwen earned in 1987 a signing bonus $3,500 and $40,000 minimum for a rookie.

San Diego Chargers
After two years with the Redskins, McEwen then spent his last three seasons in San Diego. November 30, 1990 McEwen was placed on the injured reserve list with a thigh injury.

Amsterdam Admirals World League 
McEwen was drafted #41 in the inaugural season of the franchise in the World League of American Football (WLAF) as Tight End.  Jamie Martin was the quarterback who threw McEwen a 22-yard pass for a touchdown

After football
Chris Washington and McEwen head up the San Diego Chapter of NFL Alumni.

McEwen was named Northport's High School Athletic Hall of Fame to its inaugural class on September 20, 2014.

References

1965 births
Living people
American football tight ends
Amsterdam Admirals players
San Diego Chargers players
Utah Utes football players
Washington Redskins players
People from Northport, New York
National Football League replacement players